Liga Pilipinas was a regional basketball league in the Philippines. It was sanctioned by the Samahang Basketbol ng Pilipinas, the country's national basketball federation, and owned by Pinoy Basketbol, Inc.

History
The National Basketball Conference and the Mindanao Visayas Basketball Association, along with Third Force Inc., were merged to officially form the league. The league's launch was on May 31, 2008, and games started on June 18, 2008.

In 2010, a merger between Liga Pilipinas and the Philippine Basketball League was proposed. The professional Philippine Basketball Association had hoped to form a "developmental league" from the two leagues, similar to the NBA Development League of the National Basketball Association. Through an agreement between Liga Pilipinas and the PBL, a joint tournament was held starting in June 2010. The joint tournament was held as a dry-run of the proposed developmental league. The tournament was named the Tournament of the Philippines.

Tournament of the Philippines used Liga Pilipinas' home-and-away leg format where 9 teams were involved, 3 from the Philippine Basketball League and 6 from Liga Pilipinas. The tournament started on June 9, 2010, and ended on September 13, 2010, when the M. Lhuillier Kwarta Padala-Cebu Niños became the TOP Champions by defeating the Misamis Oriental Meteors in a best-of-five final, 3-2.

After the tournament, merger talks between the 2 leagues went sour and was put off for good.

After the failure of the merger, the Philippine Basketball Association decided to independently form their own developmental league, called the PBA Developmental League.

After the PBA D-League was formed, Liga Pilipinas was able to hold one more tournament before folding in 2011 with Misamis Oriental Meteors  finally winning their second Liga title by defeating Cebu Ninos in the finals of Conference V.

Tournament of the Philippines teams (2010)
 M. Lhuillier-Cebu Niños
 Mandaue-Cebu Landmasters
 Misamis Oriental Meteors
 MP-Gensan Warriors
 Treston-Laguna Stallions
 Taguig-Hobe Bihon
 Agri Nurture Inc.-FCA Cultivators (Philippine Basketball League)
 Ascof Lagundi Natural Cough Busters (Philippine Basketball League)
 Cobra Energy Drink Iron Men (Philippine Basketball League)

2010 TOP Leg Winners
1st Leg: M. Lhuillier-Cebu Niños
Host Team: Agri Nurture Inc.-FCA
Teams in Leg: Treston-Laguna Stallions, Ascof Lagundi Natural Cough Busters, Agri Nurture Inc.-FCA, M. Lhuillier-Cebu Niños

2nd Leg: Cobra Energy Drink Iron Men
Host Team: MP-Gensan Warriors
Teams in Leg: Misamis Oriental Meteors, Treston-Laguna Stallions, Cobra Energy Drink Iron Men, MP-Gensan Warriors

3rd Leg: Treston-Laguna Stallions
Host Team: Treston-Laguna Stallions
Teams in Leg: Treston-Laguna Stallions, Cobra Energy Drink Iron Men, Mandaue-Cebu Landmasters, Ascof Lagundi Natural Cough Busters

4th Leg: Misamis Oriental Meteors
Host Team: Mandaue-Cebu Landmasters
Teams in Leg: Mandaue-Cebu Landmasters, Misamis Oriental Meteors, MP-Gensan Warriors, Agri Nurture Inc.-FCA

5th Leg: Taguig-Hobe Bihon
Host Team: Ascof Lagundi Natural Cough Busters
Teams in Leg: Ascof Lagundi Natural Cough Busters, Taguig-Hobe Bihon, Cobra Energy Drink Iron Men, MP-Gensan Warriors

6th Leg: M. Lhuillier-Niños
Host Team: M. Lhuillier-Cebu Niños
Teams in Leg: M. Lhuillier-Cebu Niños, Mandaue-Cebu Landmasters, Taguig-Hobe Bihon, Misamis Oriental Meteors

7th Leg: Cobra Energy Drink Iron Men
Host Team: Cobra Energy Drink Iron Men
Teams in Leg: Cobra Energy Drink Iron Men, M.Lhuillier-Cebu Niños, Agri Nurture Inc.-FCA, MP-Gensan Warriors

8th Leg: M. Lhuillier-Cebu Niños
Host Team: Misamis Oriental Meteors
Teams in Leg: Misamis Oriental Meteors, M. Lhuillier-Cebu Niños, Taguig-Hobe Bihon, Ascof Lagundi Natural Cough Busters

9th Leg: Taguig-Hobe Bihon
Host Team: Taguig-Hobe Bihon
Teams in Leg: Taguig-Hobe Bihon, Agri Nurture Inc.-FCA, Treston-Laguna Stallions, Mandaue-Cebu Landmasters

2010 TOP Rankings
M. Lhuillier-Cebu Niños
Misamis Oriental Meteors
Taguig-Hobe Bihon
Treston-Laguna Stallions
Cobra Energy Drink Ironmen
Ascof Lagundi Cough Busters
Agri Nurture-FCA Cultivators
MP-Gensan Warriors
Mandaue-Cebu Landmasters (eliminated)

Champions

Teams
 Laguna Golden Lions
 Ilocos Sur-CS Tigers
 M. Lhuillier-Cebu Ninos
 Mandaue-Cebu Landmasters
 Misamis Oriental Meteors
 MP-Gensan Warriors
 Pagadian Explorers
 Manila Capitals
 Iloilo Mang Inasals
 Toyota-Bacolod Turbos
 Lipa-Batangas Barakos
 Tagaytay-Cavite Heroes
 Baguio Victory
 Zanorte Babami
 Taguig Batang Global
 Zamboanga Amores
 EKB-Apayao Rapids
 Trace-Laguna Stallions
 Smart-Pampanga Buddies
 Quezon Red Oilers

External links
Statistics

 
2008 establishments in the Philippines
Sports leagues established in 2008
Defunct basketball leagues in the Philippines